The Marriage is an American sitcom that aired on NBC from July to August 1954. The series is noted as the first prime time network color television series. Broadcast live by NBC for seven episodes in the summer of 1954, the series stars real-life couple Hume Cronyn (who also produced the show) and Jessica Tandy as a New York lawyer and his wife with two children, played by Susan Strasberg and Malcolm Brodrick.

Synopsis
The half-hour show, written by Ernest Kinoy, debuted on July 8, 1954, originating from the Colonial Theatre in New York City, NBC's color television production facility.

The television series was adapted from an NBC radio series of the same title, also starring Cronyn and Tandy and written by Kinoy, that ran from October 1953 to February 1954. The television show was directed by Jack Garfein and Marc Daniels.

Reception
The New York Times television critic called the show "new and different and delightful," and wrote, "'The Marriage' is a sparkling, crisp portrayal of some charming people." The Washington Post called it among the best of the summertime replacement series, praising its "adult approach to situation comedy," with believable situations and intelligent characters.

The show was suspended after August 19, when Cronyn and Tandy left to tour on stage. There was talk in late 1954 of resuming the series, but it did not happen.

References

External links
 

1953 American television series debuts
1954 American television series endings
1950s American sitcoms
English-language television shows
American live television series
NBC original programming
Television shows set in New York City